Thyroid neoplasm is a neoplasm or tumor of the thyroid. It can be a benign tumor such as thyroid adenoma, or it can be a malignant neoplasm (thyroid cancer), such as papillary, follicular, medullary or anaplastic thyroid cancer. Most patients are 25 to 65 years of age when first diagnosed; women are more affected than men.  The estimated number of new cases of thyroid cancer in the United States in 2010 is 44,670 compared to only 1,690 deaths.  Of all thyroid nodules discovered, only about 5 percent are cancerous, and under 3 percent of those result in fatalities.

Diagnosis

The first step in diagnosing a thyroid neoplasm is a physical exam of the neck area. If any abnormalities exist, a doctor needs to be consulted. A family doctor may conduct blood tests, an ultrasound, and nuclear scan as steps to a diagnosis.  The results from these tests are then read by an endocrinologist who will determine what problems the thyroid has.
Hyperthyroidism and hypothyroidism are two conditions that often arise from an abnormally functioning thyroid gland.  These occur when the thyroid is producing too much or too little thyroid hormone respectively.

Thyroid nodules are a major presentation of thyroid neoplasms, and are diagnosed by ultrasound guided fine needle aspiration (USG/FNA) or frequently by thyroidectomy (surgical removal and subsequent histological examination). FNA is the most cost-effective and accurate method of obtaining a biopsy sample. As thyroid cancer can take up iodine, radioactive iodine is commonly used to treat thyroid carcinomas, followed by TSH suppression by high-dose thyroxine therapy.

Nodules are of particular concern when they are found in those under the age of 20. The presentation of benign nodules at this age is less likely, and thus the potential for malignancy is far greater.

Classification
Thyroid neoplasm might be classified as benign or malignant.

Benign neoplasms
Thyroid adenoma is a benign neoplasm of the thyroid.  Thyroid nodules are very common and around 80 percent of adults will have at least one by the time they reach 70 years of age.  Approximately 90 to 95 percent of all nodules are found to be benign.

Malignant neoplasms

Thyroid cancers  are mainly papillary, follicular, medullary or anaplastic thyroid cancer. Most patients are 25 to 65 years of age when first diagnosed; women are more affected than men. Nearly 80 percent of thyroid cancer is papillary and about 15 percent is follicular; both types grow slowly and can be cured if caught early. Medullary thyroid cancer makes up about 3 percent of this cancer. It grows slowly and can be controlled if caught early.  Anaplastic is the most deadly and makes up around 2 percent.  This type grows quickly and is hard to control.  The classification is determined by looking at the sample of cells under a microscope and determining the type of thyroid cell that is present.
Other thyroid malignancies include thyroid lymphoma, various types of thyroid sarcoma, smooth muscle tumors, teratoma, squamous cell thyroid carcinoma and other rare types of tumors.

Treatment
Treatment of a thyroid nodule depends on many things including size of the nodule, age of the patient, the type of thyroid cancer, and whether or not it has spread to other tissues in the body. If the nodule is benign, patients may receive thyroxine therapy to suppress thyroid-stimulating hormone and should be reevaluated in six months.  However, if the benign nodule is inhibiting the patient's normal functions of life; such as breathing, speaking, or swallowing, the thyroid may need to be removed. Sometimes only part of the thyroid is removed in an attempt to avoid causing hypothyroidism.  There is still a risk of hypothyroidism though, as the remaining thyroid tissue may not be able to produce enough hormones in the long-run.

If the nodule is malignant or has indeterminate cytologic features, it may require surgery.  A thyroidectomy is a medium-risk surgery that can result in complications if not performed correctly.  Problems with the voice, nerve or muscular damage, or bleeding from a lacerated blood vessel are rare but serious complications that may occur.  After removing the thyroid, the patient must be supplied with a replacement hormone for the rest of their life.  This is commonly a daily oral medication prescribed by their endocrinologist. 

Radioactive iodine-131 is used in patients with papillary or follicular thyroid cancer for ablation of residual thyroid tissue after surgery and for the treatment of thyroid cancer. Patients with medullary, anaplastic, and most Hurthle cell cancers do not benefit from this therapy. External irradiation may be used when the cancer is unresectable, when it recurs after resection, or to relieve pain from bone metastasis.

See also 
 Radioactive contamination

References

External links
 Thyroid Cancer Clinical Trials Page of the American Thyroid Association
 Thyroid Cancer- National Cancer Institute
 Diagnostic patient information

Thyroid disease
Endocrine neoplasia